Rajkumar Shyamanand Sinha (also known as Kumar Shyamanand Singh) (born 27 July 1916) was the eldest son of Raja Bahadur Kirtyanand Sinha of the Banaili estate. As the eldest child of a Raja, Shyamanad Sinha had many pursuits that were the hallmark of the aristocracy then but was especially notable for his talent and ability in hindustani classical music.

Learning
Though Rajkumar Shyamanand Sinha learned music from many eminent names, his acknowledged Guru was the legendary Ustad Vishmadev Chattopadyay of Kolkata, who in turn had learnt music from Ustad Badal Khan of Delhi(Sonipat)gharana and Ustad Faiyaz Khan of agra Gharana.

The musical journey of Shyamanand Sinha began early in his life when he started playing harmonium and clarionet with an elder relation in his family. The turnaround happened when in 1935, he happened to come across a 78 RPM record of Ustad Vishmadev Chattopadyay. The record had "Rut Basant" in Raga Rageshri Bahar and "Piya Pardes" in Patdeep, famous renditions by the Ustad. This moved him so much that he was now determined to learn music from him. When Ustad Vishmadev Chattopadyay visited his home for a performance in Champanagar, he created an even deeper impression on him. Kumar Girijanand Sinha in his book, "Banaili - Roots to Raj", notes that he was so moved by his performance that he began weeping like a baby. He earnestly requested and was able to convince the Ustad of his sincerity, and so the Ustad agreed to become his Guru. Shyamanand Sinha learnt from Ustad Vishmadev Chattopadyay from 1936 to 1939.

After Vishmadev Chattopadyay left for Aurobindo Ashram in Pondicherry, Rajkumar Shyamanand Sinha continued his music lessons, at the advice of his guru, from Ustad Bachu Khan Sahib of Agra (from 1940-1962-63). Ustad Bachu Khan was the son of Ustad Badal Khan. Other eminent singers from whom he obtained music lessons were Ustad Muzzaffar Khan, Ustad Mubarak Ali Khan, Pandit Bholanath Bhatt, Kedarjee, Ustad Altaf Hussain Khan of Khurja , Mahaveer Mullick, and Jaduveer Mullick.

As a Classical Vocalist

Though not a professional vocalist, Shyamanand Sinha's singing could bring "pran" in ragas and make them come alive. He belonged to the old school of Hindustani classical music and believed in maintaining purity and spontaneity in performance. His rendition of bandishes, and he possessed a veritable treasure trove obtained from his gurus, was an absolute delight and mesmerised the listeners transferring the singer's sense of ecstasy to the audience in a way that very few have managed to this day. His choice of bandishes for performances were carefully selected for their sahityic (literary) value. He laid particular emphasis on the mood of words and with extraordinary felicity married them to the mood of the ragas. For this reason, he stood apart from the current day performers as well as many of his contemporaries. A taan was to be used to beautify the rendition, where apt, and in the raganga, not just for its sake. Lamenting about modern classical music, in an interview with AIR, he stated "Ab to Bilaskhani me bhi wahi taan hote hain aur malhar me bhi wahi, ang mere kehne ka matlab hai." (Free translation: Nowadays, same taans are sung in Bilaskhani as well as Malhar and the raganga is ignored). At another place, he mentions "jo bhi gao sur me gao". As a further indication of his humility, when it came to singing, he states "one cannot sing if he said he can sing", adding that only the blessings of the god and guru can enable one to sing.

Shyamanand Sinha believed that singing was the highest form of devotion and this reflected in his performances. President Zakir Hussain, once when he was Governor of Bihar, was so moved by his performance that he embraced him stating that the Rajkumar's singing was like praying to the almighty.

The Agra influence on his singing was most unmistakable. But, as indicated above, he learnt from many others and developed his own unique style of singing.

Padmashri Gajendra Narayan Singh, former Chairperson of the Bihar Sangeet Natak Academy in his book "Swar Gandh" has written that "Kumar Shyamanand Singh of Banaili estate had such expertise in singing that many great singers including Kesarbai were convinced about his prowess in singing.In case you cannot believe this please ask Pandit Jasraj. After listening to Bandishes from Kumar Saheb, Jasraj was moved to tears and lamented that alas! he could have such ability himself"(free translation of Hindi text).

As Guru
Along with his singing prowess, his legendary voice made a tremendous mark on one and all who came in touch with him. This included some great contemporary singers like Kesarbai Kerkar. Kesarbai was visiting Champanagar for a performance and was so enthused by Rajkumar's rendition of "Dwarikanath Sharan Me Teri" that she insisted politely that he teach the song to her. She even expressed her readiness to make him her Guru for this song. After some hesitation, as Kesarbai then was an acknowledged maestro and he still young and yet in his early days, he agreed to teach her the song. Kesarbai sang this composition on a few occasions later and never forgot to acknowledge her "Guru" for the song.

His regular disciples included Shri Sitaram Jha, Kumar Jayanand Sinha, Saktinath Jha, Shankaranand Singh, Suryananranyan Jha, Girijanand Sinha, Udyanand Singh, Jayanta Chattopadhyay,  Vandana Jha, Amar Nath Jha, Kaushal Kishore Dubey, Shyam Chaitanya Jha, Vijay Kumar Jha and Ram Sharan Sinha.

Unfortunately, the excellence of his singing style and tradition did not survive his death though his influence stayed with some of his disciples who are striving hard to keep the flame burning in Purnia.

Public Acclaim
Not a professional musician, he sang for his own pleasure and which reflected in his singing. He was prone to stop singing in the middle of a performances, whenever he felt mood was deserting him, saying "ab tabyat nahi lagti bhai". This made it difficult to plan a concert around him. However, many of his admirers still managed to get him out for public performances in many places. However, in general, he shunned music as a profession and never sought public recognition. As mentioned earlier, he rarely gave public performances, most of his performances being during impromptu baithaks at his residence in Chamapanagar in the presence of his admirers and disciples. Go and ask some of these who were fortunate to listen and they would narrate the experience in a daze as if re-visiting the emotion he generated when he sang.

Despite his strong reluctance for public acknowledgement, his followers conferred him with the title of Sangeet Bhaskar and Sangeet Sudhakar for his mastery in classical singing.

As a patron of Classical Music
Shyamanand Sinha was also a patron of classical music. Ustad Vilayat Hussain Khan in his book "Sangeetangyon ke Sansmaran" has written: "There is no better connoisseur and cognoscente of music in Bihar than Kumar Shyamanand Singh"(free translation of Hindi text). He was one of the chief patrons of the All India Music Conference and presented the convocation address at the 11th All India Music Conference of the Prayag Sangit Samiti at Allahabadh on 19 December 1948. He used his great wealth to open the purse strings of patronage to many maestros of Hindustani Classical Music of his time at his residence in Champanagar, turning it into a place of learning and development of classical music. Ustad Salamat Ali Khan  , Ustad Altaf Hussain Khan of Khurja and Ustad Bachu Khan Sahib and many others were provided residence and patronage in Champanagar. He also invited many great maestros for performances, among them were "Aftab -e- Maushiqi" Ustad Faiyaz Khan,  Ustad Bade Ghulam Ali Khan, Ustad Mubarak Ali Khan, Ustad Nisaar Hussain Khan, Pandit D.V. Paluskar, Surshri Kesarbai Kerkar, Sawai Gandharva, Ustad Vilayat Hussain Khan, Ustad Hafiz Ali Khan, Ustad Altaf Hussain Khan of Khurja, Pandit Jasraj, Dilip Chand Vedi, Ustad Mushtaq Hussain Khan, Pandit Narayanrao Vyas, Pandit Basavaraj Rajguru, and Ustad Salamat Ali Khan and Nazakat Ali Khan , Malang Khan (Pakhawaj), Allauddin Khan (Sarod), Mushtaq Ali (Sitar), Pandit Bholanath Bhatt, Pandit Chinmay Lahiri, Mahaveer Mullick, Jaduveer Mullick and Ramchatur Mallick. Ustad Yunus Hussian Khan refers to "Raja Shyamanand Singh of Chamapanagar" as having invited him to sing on the occasion of his son's marriage. 

It is narrated that, in 1944, at the time of the Dasehra festival, he invited Usrad Salamat Ali Khan and Nazakat Ali Khan to perform at his palace. Kumar Saheb was so enthused by the expert rendition of Raag Malkaus that he would not allow them to leave Champanagar. The boys and their father stayed as guests of the Rajkumar for nearly two months. He also was responsible for sending them to All India Music Conference as his court musicians where they received wider recognition for the first time. 

Pandit Channulal Mishra first performance as a young artiste was at Champanagar for Kumar Saheb. After listening to him, Kumar Saheb wanted to keep the boy at Champanagar as his court musician.

Recordings
Unfortunately, the few professional recordings done by All India Radio in the latter part of his life are untraceable. Only a few amateur recordings of his singing are available with his family members and friends. These are rare treasures and absolute delight for the senses. They have somehow survived his idiosyncratic hatred for recording largely due to the efforts of his disciple nephew Kumar Girijanand Sinha, and lately by Kumar Girijanand Sinha's nephew, Santosh Jha. Every year on his birth anniversary a classical musical programme is organised in Purnea in his memory.

References
Reference to Ustad Vishmadev Chattopadyay as a Guru of Rajkumar Shyamanand Sinha 

Banaili - Roots to Raj by Kumar Girijanand Sinha; a quick reference to extracts are available here.

Swar Gandh written by Padmashri Gajendra Narayan Singh, former Bihar Sangeet Natak Academy Chairman and musicologist.

Surile Logon Ki Sangat by Padmashri Gajendra Narayan Singh, former Bihar Sangeet Natak Academy Chairman and musicologist.

Culture of Mithila
Hindustani singers
Singers from Bihar
20th-century Indian male classical singers